Hüsnü Özkara (born 25 January 1955) is a retired Turkish football defender and later manager.

References

1955 births
Living people
Turkish footballers
Trabzonspor footballers
MKE Ankaragücü footballers
Kahramanmaraşspor footballers
Association football defenders
Turkey under-21 international footballers
Turkey international footballers
Turkish football managers
Boluspor managers
Hatayspor managers
Kayseri Erciyesspor managers
Sarıyer S.K. managers
Konyaspor managers
Kayserispor managers
İstanbul Başakşehir F.K. managers
Sakaryaspor managers
Adanaspor managers
Kardemir Karabükspor managers
Giresunspor managers
Elazığspor managers
Orduspor managers
Fethiyespor managers